DTT may refer to:
 Deutscher Terminologie-Tag, German Terminology Association, known by its German initials
 Double taxation treaty, a type of international agreement to mitigate the effects of double taxation on multinational businesses
 Digital terrestrial television
 Discrete trial training
 Deloitte Touche Tohmatsu or DTT International, financial services firm
 Dithiothreitol or Cleland's reagent in chemistry